Buwenaka Tharindu Dullewa Dumbukola Goonathileka (born 8 May 1996) is a Sri Lankan badminton player. He competed at the 2016 and 2019 South Asian Games and won three silver and two bronze medals.

Career 
Goonethilleka partnered with Sachin Dias and won a bronze medal at the 2016 South Asian Games. They reached the semifinals in the 2018 Commonwealth Games but lost the bronze medal match to Goh V Shem and Tan Wee Kiong. He also won silver in the 2019 edition of the Games in Kathmandu–Pokhara.

In 2021, Goonethilleka won the men's doubles at the Bangladesh International. He later represented the Sri Lankan team at the 2022 Commonwealth Games.

Achievements

South Asian Games 
Men's doubles

Mixed doubles

BWF International Challenge/Series (1 title) 
Men's doubles

  BWF International Challenge tournament
  BWF International Series tournament

References

External links 
 
 

Living people
1996 births
People from Southern Province, Sri Lanka
Sri Lankan male badminton players
Badminton players at the 2018 Commonwealth Games
Badminton players at the 2022 Commonwealth Games
Commonwealth Games competitors for Sri Lanka
Badminton players at the 2018 Asian Games
Asian Games competitors for Sri Lanka
South Asian Games silver medalists for Sri Lanka
South Asian Games bronze medalists for Sri Lanka
South Asian Games medalists in badminton